Jozef Melis (28 August 1919 – 28 February 1994) was a Belgian footballer. He played in one match for the Belgium national football team in 1946.

References

External links
 

1919 births
1994 deaths
Belgian footballers
Belgium international footballers
Place of birth missing
Association football forwards